Each segmental medullary artery is a branch of the cervical part of the vertebral artery. These small branches penetrate into the vertebral bone through small openings such as the intervertebral foramina.  These segmental arteries  provide blood flow to the surface and inside the spinal canal at each segmental level.

The largest anterior segmental medullary artery is also known as the artery of Adamkiewicz.

They can join the anterior spinal artery.

The existence of a great posterior radiculomedullary artery has recently been confirmed by Mexican neuroanatomist Victor Hugo Pérez Pérez.

Gallery

References

Arteries of the torso